In chemistry, homology is the appearance of homologues. A homologue (also spelled as homolog) is a compound belonging to a series of compounds differing from each other by a repeating unit, such as a methylene bridge −−, a peptide residue, etc.

A homolog is a special case of an analog. Examples are alkanes and compounds with alkyl side chains of different length (the repeating unit being a methylene group -CH2-).

Periodic table 

On the periodic table, homologous elements share many electrochemical properties and appear in the same group (column) of the table. For example, all noble gases are colorless, monatomic gases with very low reactivity. These similarities are due to similar structure in their outer shells of valence electrons. Mendeleev used the prefix eka- for an unknown element below a known one in the same group.

See also 
 Homologous series
 Analog
 Congener
 Structure–activity relationship

References 

Chemical nomenclature